Wang Jinnan (born 14 July 1962) is a Chinese engineer who is president of Environmental Planning Institute of the Ministry of Ecology and Environment and director of State Environmental Protection Key Laboratory of Environmental Planning and Policy Simulation, and an academician of the Chinese Academy of Engineering.

Biography 
Wang was born in the village of Shanghuang in Jinhua County, Zhejiang, on 14 July 1962. He has five siblings. His younger brother Wang Yonghua is the leader of his home-village. He secondary studied at Baoshan High School and Wuyi No. 2 High School. He earned a bachelor's degree in 1986, a master's degree in 1988, and a doctor's degree in 2002, all from Tsinghua University.

In May 1994, he became deputy director of the Institute of Environmental Management, China Research Academy of Environmental Sciences, rising to party secretary in July 1997. In February 2002, he joined the Environmental Planning Institute of State Environmental Protection Administration (now Ministry of Ecology and Environment), becoming chief engineer in June 2003 and dean and vice-president in August 2017. In December 2006, he was recruited by Nanjing University as a professor and doctoral supervisor at the School of the Environment. He was appointed director of State Environmental Protection Key Laboratory of Environmental Planning and Policy Simulation in February 2010. In December 2017, he was elected a member of the 16th Central Committee of the Chinese Peasants and Workers Democratic Party. In March 2018, he became a delegate to the 13th National People's Congress. In July 2019, he was engaged by Zhejiang University as a chair professor.

Personal life 
Wang married Liu Yaming, who was his classmate at Wuyi No. 2 High School. She graduated from the Department of Foreign Languages, Hangzhou University (now Zhejiang University) and was deputy dean of the School of Foreign Languages, Beijing University of Science and Technology, currently serving as president of Confucius Institute of De Montfort University.

Honours and awards 
 2012 Environmental Protection Science and Technology Award (Second Class)
 2014 Environmental Protection Science and Technology Award (First Class)
 2015 Environmental Protection Science and Technology Award (First Class)
 2016 State Science and Technology Progress Award (Second Class)
 27 November 2017 Member of the Chinese Academy of Engineering (CAE)

References 

1962 births
Living people
People from Jinhua
Engineers from Zhejiang
Tsinghua University alumni
Academic staff of Zhejiang University
Academic staff of Nanjing University
Members of the Chinese Academy of Engineering
Delegates to the 13th National People's Congress